Edwin James "Peter" Wilson (27 October 1942 – 27 July 2022) was an Australian poet, painter, and lapsed scientist, with a strong interest in history.

Early life and education
Edwin Wilson was born on 27 October 1942 at Lismore, New South Wales.

He spent his early years in the then isolated farming community of East Wardell, in far northern coastal New South Wales, having been known as 'Peter' as a child, whose father died before he was born.

When his mother remarried Henry Forbes, cabinetmaker (in 1947), young 'Peter Wilson/Forbes' started school at Brunswick Heads. The 'boy poet' spent the formative decade (from 1948–1958) in Mullumbimby, prior to moving to Tweed Heads in 1959. At Mullumbimby he became a passionate orchid collector (from the surrounding rainforests).

Before attending Mullumbimby High School (at age 12) his mother told him that his name was Edwin and not Peter, and he would have to change for school banking, which was quite destabilising, an adjustment that was not properly made until he went to Murwillumbah High School (in 1959).

A scholarship to Armidale Teachers' College (1960–1961) provided his 'escape' from rural poverty, and was a period of aesthetic flowering. An appointment to The Forest High School, Frenchs Forest (1962) enabled him to complete a (part-time) science degree at the University of New South Wales (in Chemistry and Botany).

Career
Occupations: Science teacher (1962–1965); lecturer Armidale Teachers’ College (now defunct) (1968–1972); Education Officer, The Australian Museum, (1972–1980); Community Relations, Royal Botanic Gardens Sydney (1980–2002); Hon. Research Associate (Royal Botanic Gardens Sydney).

His first significant success in literary journals was with Poetry Australia (with a number of poems published over a range of years).

In 1975 he executed a literary hoax in opposition to quotas (in which he had a poem published under the female pseudonym of 'Eileen' in Kate Jennings' Mother I'm Rooted, an Anthology of Australian Women Poets).

In 1980 he moved to the Royal Botanic Gardens Sydney. In 1982 he set up Woodbine Press, a then subsidiary of Edwards & Shaw, with Dick Edwards (of Edwards & Shaw) as his silent partner. Banyan, his first book of poems, was printed  by Edwards & Shaw in their last year of business.

Wilson retired from paid work in 2003, as a research associate of the Gardens, working with Phil Spence on a breeding program using high-altitude New Guinea Latouria-type orchid hybrids, to try to bring cold-tolerance (that is, grow at Sydney equivalent latitudes without a glasshouse) into bench quality plants. In 2014 Phil Spence registered the hybrid Dendrobium tapiniense x Dendrobium johsoniae with the Royal Horticultural Society (UK) under the Grex name of Dendrobium Edwin Wilson.

In 2003 he had started art classes at the Lavender Bay Gallery, and was elected as an Exhibiting Member of the Royal Art Society of New South Wales (in 2008), and won the Medal of Distinction at the 2010 RAS Spring Show, with a joint exhibition in 2011 (with Bruce Herps, at Artarmon Galleries, Sydney), and a Mullumbimby-themed exhibition at the Tweed River Gallery (Murwillumbah) in 2014.

After an article on the centenary of ‘Tidge’ Wilson’s birth in the local paper at Lismore, New South Wales, at ‘the ripe old age of sixty one’ he was ‘discovered’ by his brother Jim, then retired, who had worked as a carpenter/builder in his life, and died in 2008.

Wilson’s twentieth book, and tenth book of poetry, My Brother Jim (2009), was dedicated to Edwin James (Jim) Onslow/Wilson, 1939–2008. His New Collected Poems came out in 2012. Stardust Painter-Poet (2015) is a glossy art catalogue with paintings linked to some of his thematic poems and poem fragments.

Personal life, death and legacy
Wilson married first Margaret Dawn Macintyre in 1968. The child of this failed marriage (James Richmond Wilson) was killed in a road accident.

His second lasting marriage was to Cheryl Lillian Turnham in 1975.

He died on 27 July 2022.

Wilson's literary papers are held in the Mitchell Library at the State Library of New South Wales in Sydney, Australia.

He is included in the Who’s Who of Australian Writers, D.W. Thorpe; Thylazine database; The Oxford Companion to Australian Literature (2nd edition, 1994); Australian Poets and Their Works, by William Wilde, Joy Hooton and Barry Andrews (OUP, 1996); MUP Encyclopaedia of Australian Science Fiction & Fantasy (Melbourne University Press, 1998); Bibliography of Australian Literature P-Z, by, John Arnold and John Hay (University of Queensland Press, 2008).

Publications
Wilson was the author of many books, including poetry, about poetry, prose, memoirs, and social history. He also had articles and poems published in numerous journals and magazines. 

Notables publications include:
 The Wishing Tree and Poetry of Place, a social history of Royal Botanic Gardens Sydney
 Falling Up Into Verse, a book about poetry
 The Mullumbimby Kid
New Collected PoemsStardust Painter-Poet References 

 Further reading 

Dan Byrnes, review of Liberty, Egality, Fraternity!, ‘It just had to be written’, The Northern Daily Leader, 6 November 1984.

John Ryan, review of Liberty, Egality, Fraternity! in The Armidale Express, 18 April 1986.

Jennifer Somerville, ‘Edwin’s poetic journey’, a review of The Mullumbimby Kid in Saturday Review, The Northern Star, 23 September 2000.

Susan Mason and John Ryan, review of Cedar House – ‘If You Were a Carpenter and I Were a Lady’, Australian Folklore (University of New England), No 17, 2002.

J.S. Ryan, "Introduction", pp. xi–xix, Anthology:Collected Poems, Armidale: Kardoorair Press, Armidale, 2002.

Edwin Wilson, ‘Mullum Dreaming: Life of a Young Poet’, as posted electronically on Thylazine: Australian Arts and Literature on Landscape and Animals, 2002.

New York based Sharon Olinka, review of Collected Poems, as published (electronically) in Australian Poetry Book Reviews, March 2004.

Radio National, Poetica, ‘A Stroll Through the Gardens’ (adapted from Australian Folklore No 15 article), played 3 December 2005, repeated 26 January 2008.

Nikki Barrowclough, ‘Two of Us: Edwin Wilson & ‘Jim’ Onslow, ‘Good Weekend’, Sydney Morning Herald, 26 August 2006, p22.

John Ryan, review of The Melancholy Dane, ‘Poems, Plants and Post-modern Australian Men and Women: or ‘The Boy from the Bush’ in Sydney Town, Australian Folklore'' (University of New England, NSW), No. 23, 2008.

Edwin Wilson, ‘Poetry and Art: An Evolutionary Biologist’s Take of Selection Pressures in the Arts’, Five Bells (Journal of the Poets Union), autumn/winter 2009.
Asteroid Belt: Poems
Anthology: Collected Poems of Edwin Wilson 1967-2002

External links 
 
 Edwin Wilson on AustLit
 Edwin Wilson literary manuscripts, ca. 1976-1986 at SLNSW
 Review of Collected Poems on API Network

1942 births
2022 deaths
Australian poets
University of New South Wales alumni
People from Lismore, New South Wales